Amphilinidae is a family of parasitic flatworms of the phylum Platyhelminthes. It is the only family in the monotypic order Amphilinidea. Amphilinids are Cestodes, yet differ from true tapeworms (Eucestoda) as their bodies are unsegmented and not divided into proglottids. "Amphilinids are large worms which have a flattened leaf-like body. Only 8 amphilinid species are known." "The adults are hermaphroditic. A muscular proboscis is located at the anterior end, and is sometimes very weakly developed or absent." They live in the body cavities of freshwater turtles and teleost fish as adults, and in the bodies of various crustaceans as juveniles. Apart from a little studied parasitism of sturgeon, these flatworms have very little economic importance. Biologically, they have gained attention for their potential to shed light on the phylogeny of tapeworms.

Subordinate taxa
 Genus Amphilina Wagener, 1858
 Amphilina foliacea (Rudolphi, 1819) Wagener, 1858
 Amphilina japonica Goto & Ishii, 1936
 Genus Australamphilina Johnston, 1931
 Australamphilina elongata Johnston, 1931
 Genus Gephyrolina Poche, 1926
 Gephyrolina paragonopora (Woodland, 1923)
 Genus Gigantolina Poche, 1922
 Gigantolina magna (Southwell, 1915) Poche, 1922
 Gigantolina raebareliensis Srivastav, Mathur & Rani, 1994
 Genus Nesolecithus Poche, 1922
 Nesolecithus africanus Dönges & Harder, 1966
 Nesolecithus janickii Poche, 1922
 Genus Schizochoerus Poche, 1922
 Schizochoerus liguloides (Diesing, 1850)

References

Cestoda
Platyhelminthes orders
Taxa named by Franz Poche